Dicalcium citrate is a compound with formula C6H6Ca2O7. It is a calcium acid salt of citric acid.

See also
 Calcium citrate
 Monocalcium citrate

References
Food Additives in Europe 2000, pp. 322-324, Nordic Council of Ministers, 2002 .

Citrates
Calcium compounds
Acid salts